Crew Dragon Freedom (Dragon capsule C212) is a Crew Dragon spacecraft manufactured and operated by SpaceX and used by NASA's Commercial Crew Program. On 27 April 2022, it was launched to transport four personnel to the International Space Station as part of the SpaceX Crew-4 mission, which was a part of ISS Expedition 67.

History
On 23 March 2022, it was announced that Dragon C212 will be called Freedom. Astronaut Kjell Lindgren said that the name was chosen because it celebrates a fundamental human right, and the industry and innovation that emanate from the unencumbered human spirit.  The name also honors Freedom 7, the space capsule used by Alan Shepard's Mercury Redstone 3, the first United States human spaceflight mission (May 5, 1961).

Flights

References

External links 
 

SpaceX Dragon 2
Individual space vehicles
NASA spacecraft
Crewed spacecraft